Concret PH (1958) is a musique concrète piece by Iannis Xenakis, originally created for the Philips Pavilion (designed by Xenakis as Le Corbusier's assistant) at the Expo 58 and heard as audiences entered and exited the building (PH = paraboloïdes hyperboliques, concret = reinforced concrete/musique concrète). Edgard Varèse's Poème électronique was played once they were inside the building.

At 2 1/2 minutes long and focused primarily on density, "Concret PH" was created in the Philips office in Paris (Varèse having exclusive access to the studio with spatialization capabilities established at the Philips Research Laboratories in Eindhoven) or at the Groupe de Recherches Musicales. The only sound source is burning charcoal, cut into one-second fragments, with numerous transpositions and overdubs, a granular texture from which Xenakis creates a continuum. Using slight manipulation, the main techniques were splicing, tape speed change, and mixing. The piece was composed intuitively, rather than being guided by mathematical processes. In the Philips Pavilion, it was projected over 425 loudspeakers through an 11-channel sound system. Xenakis described the effect as "lines of sound moving in complex paths from point to point in space, like needles darting from everywhere."

Sources

Further reading
Di Scipio, Agostino (1998). "Compositional Models in Xenakis's Electroacoustic Music". Perspectives of New Music 36, no. 2 (Summer): 201–243.
Norman, Katharine (2004). Sounding Art: Eight Literary Excursions Through Electronic Music, p. 22–25. .

Compositions by Iannis Xenakis
1958 compositions
Musique concrète
Spatial music
World's fair music